Zoe Jeanneau Canto (born 10 April 1993), also known as La Zowi, is a Spanish trap musician.

Biography 
La Zowi was born in Paris, France and raised in Granada, Spain, although she has lived in diverse European cities such as Marseille, London, Barcelona and Madrid, where she currently resides. She is the daughter of artists (her mother is a feminist poet and her father, Patrice Jean Marcel Jeanneau, a flamenco guitarist known as El Yerbita). She grew up listening to Flamenco, which, according to her, "has been my environment and my way of life. Latin and African music have also become the basis of my references."
She also has a child called Romeo with the Spanish rapper Yung Beef.

Musical career 
She began her musical career creating music with friends, among whom were the members of Pxxr Gvng. She speaks mainly of social issues associated to trap music, such as drugs, money and putas (bitches in Spanish). In several interviews she has expressed that she does not like her own voice. In her lyrics, social constructs such as money, putas, drugs and her "goonies" are repeated throughout her songs. Her most common catchphrase is "La Zowi Puta".

She released her first track "Raxeta" in 2013 through YouTube. The word "raxeta" is a loanword re-appropriation of the English word "ratchet", a term from Louisianan African American Vernacular English, which denotes any combination of trashiness, a working-class sensibility, and authenticity (especially of the Black American experience). "For me, a ratchet is someone like me, a humble neighborhood girl who wears cheap clothes and imitations of luxury brands, and does it provocatively." She has collaborated with almost every artist associated with La Vendicion Records, such as Bea Pelea and La Goony Chonga, and has worked recurrently with producers Zora Jones and Mark Luva. 

On November 22 she released her first mixtape, titled "Ama de casa", published through the same label. The mixtape has vocal features from Albany, Flynt Hustle and GOA, as well as the producers DP Beats, Steve Lean, Barla, Oddlaw or Tweak.

La Zowi, together with Alizzz, were also in charge of introducing the second season of the musical show El Bloque TV, which is broadcast on YouTube.

In one of her interviews with WAG1 Magazine in 2016, La Zowi defined what trap was for her, a movement that gone viral during that year. According to what the artist commented, trap is "money and drugs" but also a way for women to empower.

In 2020, she released her debut album called "Elite" and goes back to the talk show La Resistencia to present it. It is a 9-song album which mixes her distinctive concepts with experimental electronic sounds. Zora Jones, Pablo Chill-E and Paul Marmota are some artists that have collaborations in Elite.

She debuted as an actress in the Spanish TV series Cristina La Veneno, created by Los Javis (Javier Ambrossi and Javier Calvo), playing the role of Sonia Monroy, a famous Spanish television character.

In 2022, she was a guest judge on season 2 of Drag Race España.

Thematic and controversies
In an interview for "INDIE" la Zowi has described herself as a feminist, supporting women who sexualize themselves. Regarding her music and lyricism, she has stated that it relies a lot on her lifestyle and thought-provoking material.
She described herself as a feminist: "Yes, I am a feminist: I believe in equality between women and men. But I really don't feel represented by the kind of feminism that tries to embarrass women who sexualize themselves."

In January 2019, comedian David Broncano interviewed her on the TV program La Resistencia. The interview caused controversial reactions on social networks, especially through Twitter. A few days later, Yolanda Domínguez published an article in the HuffPost entitled "Is La Zowi a feminist icon?", criticizing the feminism proclaimed by the singer, who declares that she faces sexism in the industry with her lyrics. She has also been criticized because of her shows for being too punk, sexual and explicit.

Discography

Mixtapes 

 Ama de casa (2018)
 Élite (2020)

Singles 

 Ratxeta (2013)
 Oye papi (2016)
 Mi chulo (2016)
 Obra de arte (2016)
 Random hoe (2016)
 La chismoteka (2017)
 Money hoe (2017)
 High (2017)
 Tu y yo (2017)
 Bitch te quemas (2017)
 Llámame (2018)
 B*tch mode (2018)
 No lo ves (2018)
 Empezar de cero (2019)
 Boss (2019)
 Filet mignon (2020)
 Full time (2020)
 Sugar mami (2020)
 Indecente (2020)
 Nada (2020)
 Sin modales (2021)
 Matrix (2021)
 Tutoto (2021)
 Terapia de choque (2022)
 Ping pong (2022)

As featured artist 

 "Demonic" (Single by Namasenda)
 "Revolea" (Single by Ms Nina, TAICHU, Ebhoni)

References

Spanish musicians
Living people
1993 births
Spanish people of French descent
Neoperreo musicians